Sideways is a 2004 American comedy-drama road film directed by Alexander Payne and written by Jim Taylor and Payne. A film adaptation of Rex Pickett's 2004 novel of the same name, Sideways follows two men in their forties, Miles Raymond (Paul Giamatti), a depressed teacher and unsuccessful writer, and Jack Cole (Thomas Haden Church), a past-his-prime actor, who take a week-long road trip to Santa Barbara County wine country to celebrate Jack's upcoming wedding. Sandra Oh and Virginia Madsen also star as women they encounter during their trip. The film premiered at the Toronto International Film Festival on September 13, 2004, and was released in the United States on October 22, 2004. Sideways received widespread acclaim from critics and is regarded as one of the greatest films of the 2000s. It was nominated for Best Picture, Best Director, Best Supporting Actor (Haden Church) and Best Supporting Actress (Madsen), winning Best Adapted Screenplay at the 77th Academy Awards.

Plot
Miles Raymond is an unpublished writer, a wine aficionado, and a depressed, middle-aged English teacher living in San Diego. He takes Jack Cole, his soon-to-be-married actor friend and former college roommate, on a road trip through the Santa Ynez Valley wine country. Jack now does commercial voice-overs and plans to enter his future father-in-law's successful real estate business. Soon after the trip begins, Miles insists on stopping to see his mother in Oxnard, as it is the day before her birthday. He steals a thousand dollars from her room that night. The men sneak out the next morning to avoid the birthday gathering.

Miles wants to spend the week relaxing, playing golf, and enjoying good food and wine. However, much to Miles' consternation, Jack is on the prowl and wants one last sexual fling before settling into domestic life. In the wine country, the pair dine at  The Hitching Post II. Jack sees that Maya, a waitress with whom Miles is casually acquainted, is interested in Miles; Miles thinks she is only being professionally friendly. Jack lies to Maya that Miles' manuscript has been accepted for publication, although it is only being considered. At a wine tasting the next day, Jack arranges a double date with a wine pourer named Stephanie, who is also acquainted with Maya.

During the date, Miles gets drunk and telephones Victoria, his ex-wife, after learning from Jack that she has remarried and will be bringing her new husband to Jack's wedding. The two couples go to Stephanie's home, where she and Jack adjourn to her bedroom for sex. Miles and Maya connect through their mutual interest in wine, and Miles kisses her awkwardly. As they are leaving separately, Miles gives her a copy of his manuscript, which Maya had earlier expressed interest in reading.

Jack claims to have fallen in love with Stephanie and tells Miles he wants to move to Santa Ynez Valley to be closer to her. After spending time with Jack and Stephanie at wineries and a picnic, Miles and Maya return to her apartment and have sex. The next day, Miles lets it slip that Jack is to be married. Disgusted with the men's dishonesty, Maya dumps Miles.

Jack and Miles go to a winery that Miles finds subpar. After hearing from his literary agent that his manuscript has been rejected, an upset Miles pesters the pourer for a "full pour" of wine. When the server refuses, Miles drinks from the spit bucket, creating a scene. Jack intervenes and drives Miles back to the motel. Upon arrival, Stephanie approaches Jack knowing about his engagement and breaks Jack's nose with her motorcycle helmet, screaming about being lied to. Miles takes Jack to the ER and leaves Maya an apologetic voice message, admitting that his book is not going to be published. That night, Jack hooks up with a waitress named Cammi, despite Miles's protests. Later, Jack returns to the motel naked, having been caught having sex with Cammi by her husband. Jack begs Miles to help him retrieve his wallet, which contains custom wedding rings. Miles sneaks into the house, where he discovers Cammi and her husband having sex. Miles grabs the wallet and runs, barely escaping the nude and irate husband.

Jack intentionally drives Miles's car into a tree so it looks as if he broke his nose in an accident. The pair return to the fiancée's home, where Jack is warmly received by the family.

Following the wedding ceremony, Miles runs into his ex-wife Victoria and meets her new husband, Ken. Victoria tells Miles that she is pregnant. Miles absconds before the reception, driving back to his San Diego apartment. Alone, he drinks his prized wine, a 1961 Château Cheval Blanc, from a disposable styrofoam soda cup at a fast-food restaurant. Miles returns to the routine of teaching school. One day he receives a voicemail from Maya, who says she enjoyed his manuscript and invites him to visit. Miles drives back to wine country and knocks on Maya's door.

Cast

 Paul Giamatti as Miles Raymond
 Thomas Haden Church as Jack Cole
 Virginia Madsen as Maya Randall
 Sandra Oh as Stephanie
 Marylouise Burke as Mrs. Raymond, Miles' Mother
 Jessica Hecht as Victoria Cortland
 Lee Brooks as Ken Cortland
 Missy Doty as Cammi
 MC Gainey as Cammi's husband
 Alysia Reiner as Christine Erganian
 Shake Tukhmanyan as Mrs. Erganian
 Shaun Duke as Mike Erganian
 Stephanie Faracy as Ginny, Stephanie's mother
 Natalie Carter as Siena, Stephanie's daughter
 Patrick Gallagher as Gary the Bartender
 Joe Marinelli as Frass Canyon Pourer

Impact on wine industry

The film drew attention and increased tourism to the Santa Ynez Valley wine-growing region of California's Central Coast. During the film, Miles speaks fondly of the red wine varietal pinot noir while denigrating merlot. After the film's U.S. release in October 2004, merlot sales dropped 2% while pinot noir sales increased 16% in the Western United States. A similar trend occurred in British wine outlets.

A 2009 study by Sonoma State University found that Sideways slowed the growth in merlot sales volume and caused its price to fall, but the film's main effect on the U.S. wine industry was a rise in the sales volume and price of pinot noir and in overall wine consumption.

A 2022 study in the Journal of Wine Economics found that Sideways caused a reduction in demand for merlot and an increase in demand for pinot noir, which led large winemakers to grow pinot noir grapes in low-quality land and blend those grapes with the grapes grown in high-quality areas just to meet demand, ultimately leading to worse pinot noir wines.

Sideways Pinot Noir
In 2013, Rex Pickett, author of the Sideways novel, released his own pinot noir called Le Plus Ultra. In 2020, he released a pinot noir titled Sideways.

Soundtrack

The original soundtrack album features 15 jazz instrumentals composed and produced by Rolfe Kent and was orchestrated and arranged for the band by Tony Blondal. The album was nominated for the Golden Globe Award for "Best Original Score", and the music proved so popular there was demand for a national tour. Eventually a few cities were chosen to perform in as the composer was too busy to commit to more. The romantic leitmotif shared by Miles and Maya is excerpted from Symbiosis by Claus Ogerman and Bill Evans.

 "Asphalt Groovin'"  – 4:00
 "Constantine Snaps His Fingers"  – 3:03
 "Drive!"  – 3:56
 "Picnic"  – 2:15
 "Lonely Day"  – 1:40
 "Wine Safari"  – 2:13
 "Miles' Theme"  – 2:59
 "Los Olivos"  – 2:43
 "Chasing the Golfers"  – 3:03
 "Walk to Hitching Post"  – 2:32
 "Abandoning the Wedding"  – 3:25
 "Slipping Away As Mum Sleeps"  – 1:00
 "Bowling Tango"  – 0:49
 "I'm Not Drinking Any #@%!$ Merlot!"  – 1:13
 "Miles And Maya"  – 2:26

Reception
On review aggregator Rotten Tomatoes, Sideways has an approval rating of 97% based on 233 reviews, and an average rating of 8.5/10. The website's critical consensus reads: "Charming, thoughtful, and often funny, Sideways is a decidedly mature road trip comedy full of excellent performances." On Metacritic, the film has a weighted average score of 94 out of 100 based on 42 reviews, indicating "universal acclaim". Audiences polled by CinemaScore gave the film an average grade of "B" on an A+ to F scale.

Time Out described the film as "intelligent, funny and moving", and Roger Ebert of the Chicago Sun-Times gave it four stars out of four, writing that, "what happens during the seven days adds up to the best human comedy of the year – comedy, because it is funny, and human, because it is surprisingly moving."

With the exception of Giamatti, who had already starred in the critically acclaimed film American Splendor (2003), the film was a career breakthrough for the stars. Church and Madsen were each nominated for the Screen Actors Guild Award, Golden Globe Award, and Academy Award for their performances, winning the Broadcast Film Critics Association Award and Independent Spirit Award for their respective categories. Giamatti was described as "The World's Best Character Actor" by Time magazine. In 2005 Sandra Oh went on to star in the ABC medical drama Grey's Anatomy, for which she won two Screen Actors Guild Awards and one Golden Globe Award.

Sideways was ranked 494th on Empires 2008 list of the 500 greatest movies of all time. Total Film put Sideways on its list of 100 Greatest Movies of All Time. In 2013, the Writers Guild of America also ranked its script as the 90th greatest ever written.

Stage and musical adaptations
In 2019, it was announced that Sideways was scheduled to be adapted for a stage musical. Kathleen Marshall is expected to be the director and choreographer for the musical, which was aiming for a spring or summer 2020 tryout in a regional venue prior to Broadway. The musical will have a book by Rex Pickett and the score by Anthony Leigh Adams.

A play adapted by author Rex Pickett from the Sideways novel was produced at multiple theaters in the United States and the United Kingdom, including at the La Jolla Playhouse.

In addition to the musical, it was reported that Pickett had written screenplays based on his two Sideways sequels already in print, Vertical and Sideways 3 Chile.

Accolades
As of 2022, Payne and Taylor are the only two screenwriters to ever sweep the rarest achievements known as "The Big Four" critics awards (LAFCA, NBR, NYFCC, NSFC), in addition to winning the Oscar, Globe, BAFTA, WGA, and Critic's Choice Awards for the film.

Japanese remake
Fox International Productions and Fuji TV released a Japanese-language remake of the film in October 2009, サイドウェイズ, often rendered in Romaji as Saidoweizu. The film is directed by Cellin Gluck and stars Katsuhisa Namase, Fumiyo Kohinata, Kyōka Suzuki, and Rinko Kikuchi, and has a soundtrack composed and performed by Hawaiian-born ukulele virtuoso Jake Shimabukuro.

The remake shifts the setting of the film to Napa Valley. Although listed as an executive producer, Payne was not involved with the remake, although he gave it his blessing. Giamatti declined an invitation to make an unspecified cameo appearance in the film.

Possible sequel
Pickett wrote a sequel to his novel, Vertical, in 2011, following Miles and Jack on a road trip to Oregon with Miles' mother. Payne has declined to consider a sequel to the film. Fox Searchlight owns the rights to the characters, but Payne's lack of interest makes the film a non-starter for Fox.

See also

 List of American films of 2004
 List of media set in San Diego

References

External links
 
 
 The Danish Soul of That Town in Sideways

2004 films
2004 black comedy films
American black comedy films
2004 independent films
2004 romantic comedy-drama films
American buddy comedy-drama films
American romantic comedy-drama films
BAFTA winners (films)
Best Musical or Comedy Picture Golden Globe winners
2000s English-language films
Films about actors
Films about friendship
Films about infidelity
Films about vacationing
Films about wine
Films about writers
Films based on American novels
Films directed by Alexander Payne
Films set in California
Films shot in California
Films whose writer won the Best Adapted Screenplay Academy Award
Films whose writer won the Best Adapted Screenplay BAFTA Award
Fox Searchlight Pictures films
Independent Spirit Award for Best Film winners
Midlife crisis films
2000s buddy comedy-drama films
2000s road comedy-drama films
American road comedy-drama films
American independent films
Santa Ynez Valley
Films with screenplays by Alexander Payne
Films with screenplays by Jim Taylor (writer)
Films scored by Rolfe Kent
2004 comedy films
2004 drama films
Films set in San Diego
2000s American films